Colonel Walter Douglas (1670–1739) was Captain-General and Governor-General of the Leeward Islands.

Walter Douglas was one of seven sons of William Douglas of Baads (d. 1705) and his wife, Joan, daughter of James Mason of Park, Blantyre. One of his brothers was the surgeon John Douglas (d. 1759), another James Douglas, (1675-1742), FRS, a physician and anatomist, and a third George Douglas, FRS, (-1737) a physician.

Walter Douglas appears to have been educated at the University of Utrecht, which he is said to have left to join King William of Orange when he invaded England in 1688. The Duke of Queensbury was his patron.

Colonel Douglas was appointed Governor of the Leeward Islands in 1711 following the assassination of his predecessor, Colonel Parke, during a mutiny triggered by his self-enriching enforcement of Stuart imperialism. He was superseded as governor in 1716. he was elected a Fellow of the Royal Society in 1711.

Governor Douglas had been tried by the Court of King's Bench and found guilty of bribery and extortion, having exacted £10,000 from the Island of Antigua before publishing the Queen's pardon for those involved in the killing of his predecessor. He was sentenced to a £500 fine and five years' imprisonment, and was then in the King's Bench Prison. His fine was remitted. At the time of his trial, he was described as Major Douglas.

It is thought he retired to France.
 
In 1720 he succeeded to the estate of Baads on the renunciation of his brother William but then sold it.

Walter Douglas married Lady Jane St Leger, and had two sons, John St Leger Douglas, a West Indian plantation owner, and James George Douglas. His grandson was Col John St Leger Douglas, MP.

References

1670 births
1739 deaths
Utrecht University alumni
British Army officers
Governors of the Leeward Islands
Fellows of the Royal Society
Civil servants from Edinburgh
People convicted of bribery